Brookville, New Jersey may refer to:
Brookville, Hunterdon County, New Jersey
Brookville, Ocean County, New Jersey